S. L. Akshay (born 30 April 1987) is an Indian first-class cricketer who plays for Karnataka. He made his first-class debut in the 2011–12 Ranji Trophy.

References

External links
 

1987 births
Living people
Indian cricketers
Karnataka cricketers
People from Shimoga
Cricketers from Karnataka